Ampel is a town and an urban sub-district (kelurahan) in the Semampir District of Surabaya City, East Java, Indonesia.  The town is known for its historic Ampel Mosque, and more than 98% of its population are Muslim, with many of them being Arab Indonesians originating from Hadhramaut.

References

External links
 Kecamatan Semampir

Gallery

Populated places in East Java
Sub-districts of Semampir
Surabaya